Aspergillus cleistominutus is a species of fungus in the genus Aspergillus. It is from the Nidulantes section. It has been reported to produce arugosin A, arugosin B, arugosin C, asperthecin, aspertetronin A, aspertetronin B, echinocandin B, echinocandin C, echinocandin D, epishamixanthone, shamixanthone, orsellinaldehyde, penicillin G, ruguloxanthone, and sterigmatocystin. It has been isolated from soil in New Jersey, United States.

Growth and morphology
A. cleistominutus has been cultivated on both Czapek yeast extract agar (CYA) plates and Malt Extract Agar Oxoid® (MEAOX) plates. The growth morphology of the colonies can be seen in the pictures below.

References 

cleistominutus